Sir Crawfurd Wilfred Griffin Eady  (27 September 1890 – 9 January 1962) was a British civil servant and diplomat.

Eady was born in the village of Villa Nueva, Argentina, the son of George Griffin Eady, a railway civil engineer, and Lilian Armstrong D'Olivier Millar, the daughter of Gen. John Crawfurd Millar. He was educated at Clifton College, and read classics at Jesus College, Cambridge leaving with first-class honours in 1912.

He was a British delegate to the Bretton Woods Conference of July 1944, in New Hampshire. The conference was to decide the post-war international financial system; it led to the International Monetary Fund and World Bank. John Maynard Keynes was hailed as the presiding intellect at the conference. Eady, at a banquet on the last night of the conference remarked: "The whole meeting spontaneously stood up and waited, silent, until he [Keynes] had taken his place. Someone of more than ordinary stature had entered the room."
 
After the Second World War, Eady negotiated a loan to Britain, from Canada, of a billion and a quarter dollars, and cancelled debts of $425,000,000 (incurred when Canada housed and trained British flyers during the war under the Commonwealth Air Training Plan) and $150,000,000 (other war debts). Eady remarked on this loan, designed to keep afloat a trading relationship between the two countries, that it was by no means a one-way deal and that almost all the money will be spent in Canada, principally on foods and manufactured goods.

Eady was the Principal of The Working Men's College from 1949 to 1955. Liberal Education, the raison d'etre of the College, was defined by Eady as "... something you can enjoy for its own sake, something which is a personal possession and an inward enrichment, and something which teaches a sense of values."

Between 1949 and 1951, he was the chairman of Civil Service Benevolent Fund.

in 1957, Eady gave his name to the Eady Levy on cinema ticket sales, a tax designed and introduced by President of the Board of Trade Harold Wilson who said:  "If you want to get a measure adopted, name it after the civil servant who would have to implement it."

His son was the film director David Eady.

He died in 1962 and was buried at Rodmell, Sussex, England.

References

1890 births
1962 deaths
English civil servants
British diplomats
Knights Grand Cross of the Order of St Michael and St George
Knights Commander of the Order of the Bath
Knights Commander of the Order of the British Empire